Wang Weixin (born 4 May 1975) is a Chinese fencer. He competed in the individual and team épée events at the 2000 Summer Olympics.

References

1975 births
Living people
Chinese male fencers
Olympic fencers of China
Fencers at the 2000 Summer Olympics